William Cope may refer to:

Sir William Cope (cofferer) (c. 1440–1513), cofferer to Henry VII and Keeper of Portchester Castle
Sir William Cope, 2nd Baronet (died 1637), MP for Banbury, Oxfordshire and Newton
William Cope, 1st Baron Cope (1870–1946), British politician and Wales international rugby player
William Cope (footballer) (1884–1937), English footballer with Oldham and West Ham
William T. Cope (1836–1902), Republican politician in the state of Ohio and Ohio State Treasurer
Bill Cope (academic) (born 1957), Australian academic, author and educational theorist
Bill Cope (footballer) (1899–1979), English soccer player with Bolton and Port Vale